Dawn of Chromatica is the third remix album by American singer Lady Gaga, released on September 3, 2021, by Streamline and Interscope Records. Consisting of remixes of songs from her sixth studio album, Chromatica (2020), the album embraces an underground, hyperpop production and features collaborations with numerous pop and electronic musicians.

Gaga's goal with the album was to display her love and support towards younger and upcoming artists. The featured acts include Arca, Rina Sawayama, Pabllo Vittar, Charli XCX, Ashnikko, Shygirl, Dorian Electra and Bree Runway, while retaining the contributions of Ariana Grande, Blackpink and Elton John from the original album. Dawn of Chromatica received generally favorable reviews from music critics, who underscored its experimental nature. Commercially, it peaked at number 66 on the US Billboard 200, while topping the Dance/Electronic Albums chart.

Background and recording 
On March 2, 2020, American singer Lady Gaga announced that her sixth album, Chromatica, was to be released on April 10. The album was later postponed due to the COVID-19 pandemic, though it was eventually released on May 29, 2020. On April 4, 2021, the album's executive producer, BloodPop, teased the possibility of a Chromatica remix album, asking his Twitter followers to suggest which artists they would like to see on such a project if it were to exist. He later replied to his tweet and tagged Japanese-British musician Rina Sawayama, who replied to it with a smirking emoji. He also confirmed he was working with British musician Charli XCX on a remix of the album's third single "911", and that the remix album would include an early version of "Babylon" that soundtracked an advertisement for Gaga's cosmetics brand Haus Laboratories. On May 8, BloodPop revealed on his Twitter that American musician Dorian Electra would be on the album. During an interview at the 2021 Brit Awards, Sawayama talked about the project, stating that "The wish is on the internet, and I've done my bit, let's just say that. So, it's in the works." She also hinted that the song she was featured on was "Free Woman". 

On May 12, 2021, Charli XCX announced that production for the "911" remix had begun. Later that month, British musician Bree Runway revealed she was involved with the remix album during an interview on The Jonathan Ross Show, while on August 10, announcing she would appear on a remix of "Babylon" by tweeting out its lyrics. That same day, Gaga acknowledged the album for the first time, saying that it was "so f*cking " in a tweet, and American singer and rapper Ashnikko confirmed her involvement with the project. A snippet of her "Plastic Doll" remix was teased by RuPaul's Drag Race winner Aquaria during a DJ set in the weeks leading up to the album's announcement. During the same period of time, Brazilian singer and drag queen Pabllo Vittar hinted that she would be featured on a remix of the song "Fun Tonight", and American producer Lil Texas confirmed his involvement by posting a short snippet of his remix of "Sine from Above". Other announced contributors include British musician Shygirl and Venezuelan producer Arca, who revealed to her Discord fan server that she had remixed Chromaticas second single "Rain on Me", which features American singer Ariana Grande.

In July 2021, Canadian producer and singer Grimes announced on her Discord that she had produced remixes of the three interludes featured on Chromatica. She mentioned that she initially missed the deadline to submit them to the record label, but later speculated that due to the project's delay, there would be time. However, after the album's official announcement on August 30, 2021, it was apparent that Grimes' contributions did not make the cut. 

Talking about the album, Maureen Lee Lenker of Entertainment Weekly opined that "while most remix albums are a further celebration of the lead artist's music, the forward-thinking Lady Gaga uses Dawn of Chromatica to also spotlight some of the recent pop talent that's blossomed in her image." In an interview with The Wall Street Journal after the release of the record, Gaga said: "I love young artists and support them. All of them on the album have something to say, and they performed their hearts out."

Composition 

Dawn of Chromatica contains mainly underground pop and hyperpop sound. The second song in the track list, "Stupid Love", is remixed by the French producer Coucou Chloe, who "strips away the lead single's bubblegum beats to reveal a macabre midnight romp". Arca's remix of "Rain on Me" follows as the third track; she introduces synths in the song and samples the songs "Time" and "Mequetrefe" off her fourth studio album Kick I (2020), as well as the Changa tuki track "Mételo Sácalo" by DJ Yirvin. Rina Sawayama and English producer Clarence Clarity's remix of "Free Woman" features influences of metal with wailing riffs and drum fills, which resembles Gaga's 2011 studio album Born This Way. Sawayama starts the songs saying "let's go Gaga". Pabllo Vittar's reimagination of "Fun Tonight" consists of forró music.

The Charli XCX and English producer A. G. Cook remix of "911" gives a "transcendental" sound to the original version, with an overly distorted chorus and a new verse with lines such as "I look out to Venus and search for a place / And search for a place / And sometimes I hate myself" and "If it's all getting way harder / Turn it up, party to Gaga". Ashnikko remixed "Plastic Doll" into a trap version, changing its mid-tempo composition." "Sour Candy", featuring South Korean girl group Blackpink, receives a "booty-popping" club version by Shygirl and the Guernsey producer Mura Masa, and includes little metallic whizzes. The remix, however, retains vocal contributions of Blackpink's Rosé and Lisa only, removing those of Jennie and Jisoo. The album follows with an EDM remix of "Enigma" by American producer Doss, featuring "pulsating drops". Dorian Electra's remix of "Replay" is influenced by metal and features "dramatic vocals" and "menacing growls".

"Sine from Above", a duet with English musician Elton John, was remixed by American musician Chester Lockhart, Canadian musician Mood Killer, and Lil Texas. Their version features distorted bass, glitched trap, drum & bass, cartoonish sound samples, a sax solo and finishes with hardstyle music. English musician Planningtorock's turns "1000 Doves" into a new wave track with house music influence. The album closes with two versions of "Babylon": the "throbbing techno revamp" featuring Bree Runway and American producer Jimmy Edgar, alongside the "sledgehammering" Haus Labs version.

Although BloodPop previously teased potential release of Gaga's collaborations with late Scottish producer Sophie that were scrapped from the original album, none of the songs appear on Dawn of Chromatica. Sam Murphy of Junkee neverhteless acknowledged the "impact she has had on this futuristic brand of pop music. [...] The hyperpop movement [...] can largely be traced back to Sophie, and all the artists who appear here display some of Sophie's influence." The producers of the "Sine from Above" remix further underscored this. Mood Killer stated that Sophie's "presence is all over the remix album. It's undeniable; she's part of the fabric of our scene and the industry, or whatever — our corner of it." Chesther Lockhart added that "even if the style is different, so many of the sounds and the forward-thinking-ness and the ability to use electronic instruments in a different way is inspired by Sophie's impact on this underground electronic music scene over the past decade."

Release 
Dawn of Chromatica was officially announced on August 30, 2021, and released on September 3, on streaming and digital download formats. Its CD was released on November 19, 2021, while the vinyl was released in March 2022. On the release day, Gaga posted a video of herself with cartoon filters through her social media. It included a snippet from the breakdown of the "Sine from Above" remix, along with a message encouraging her followers to "smile and dance through the pain". In a further Twitter post, she invited her followers to celebrate the album's artists "who see the world, feel the world, and put that feeling into something bigger than all of us: music."

Critical reception

According to Metacritic, which assigns a normalized rating out of 100 to reviews from mainstream critics, Dawn of Chromatica received a score of 74 based on four reviews, indicating "generally favorable reviews".

Neil Z. Yeung of AllMusic called the album "the daring and liberated sibling" to Chromatica, with "wild, sometimes noisy, and always thrilling reimaginings." Dubbing it "brilliantly entertaining", Robin Murray from Clash stated that "this remix compilation is an excuse to adore Lady Gaga for her abilities as a cultural curator, one of this generation's few – only – true interstellar pop talents." Sam Murphy of Junkee thought that the remix album "unlocks the thrilling potential of the original", adding that "the whole album is noisy and garish, but it's thrilling to hear Gaga in a sonic arena that's uninhibited by what is happening in the mainstream. Wolfgang Ruth of Vulture claimed that "filled with sliving remixes containing sliving features [...] this record is, no surprise, next level." Writing for Gigwise, Alex Rigotti referred to it as "deliciously dramatic pop insanity". 

According to Pitchfork Jamieson Cox, Dawn of Chromatica is "less a wall-to-wall collection of club bangers than an expansion of the Chromatica cinematic universe," and feels "less like a celebration of a world-beating record and more like passing the torch." Tom Hull described the album as "beats sharpened, persona reduced, like a filter that turns realistic photos into caricatures." Vinyl Chapters Caillou Pettis believed that "Lady Gaga managed to compile a bunch of great artists to remix Chromatica to excellent results. It’s not as good as the original record, but it does put a unique and extremely entertaining fresh coat of paint on the album...". He further called it "genuinely amazing and an absolute blast to listen to". Alexa Camp of Slant Magazine was more critical, opining "the album is a mixed bag, swinging wildly between microgenres and quality from track to track. If the original album favored pop hooks over musical invention, many of the versions on Dawn of Chromatica are noisy or just plain tuneless."

Commercial performance 
In the United States, Dawn of Chromatica debuted at number 66 on the Billboard 200 chart with 11,000 album-equivalent units, while topping the Dance/Electronic Albums chart. This made Gaga tie the record for the most cumulative number one dance albums and extend her record as the artist with the most cumulative weeks at number one (at 211 weeks). She also became the first artist in history to occupy the top four positions in a single week, with Dawn of Chromatica, Born This Way (2011), The Fame (2008), and Chromatica (2020), respectively.

Track listing 

Notes
  signifies a songwriter that is only listed on physical editions of the album.

 "Rain on Me" samples "All This Love That I'm Givin'", written by Jeremiah Burden, Lynn Williams and Betty Wright, performed by Gwen McCrae.
 "Replay" samples "It's My House", written by Nickolas Ashford and Valerie Simpson, performed by Diana Ross.

Charts

Release history

References

External links 
 Official website

2021 remix albums
Albums produced by BloodPop
Hyperpop albums
Interscope Records albums
Lady Gaga compilation albums
Lady Gaga remix albums